Khonogor (Xonoğor) is a rural locality (a selo) in Suottunsky Rural Okrug of Ust-Aldansky District in the Sakha Republic, Russia, located  from Borogontsy, the administrative center of the district, and  from Ogorodtakh, the administrative center of the rural okrug. Its population at the 2002 census was 742.

References

Notes

Sources

Rural localities in Ust-Aldansky District